This is a list of maritime container terminals.

Albania

Port of Durres

Algeria

Port of Algiers
Port of Djen Djen

Angola
Port of Amboim (Porto Amboim)
Port of Cabinda
Port of Lobito
Port of Luanda
Port of Namibe
Port of Soyo

Argentina

Port of Buenos Aires

Australia

Port Botany (seaport), Sydney
Port of Brisbane
Port of Fremantle
Port of Melbourne
Port of Adelaide

Bangladesh

Port of Chittagong
Port of Pangaon

Belgium

Port of Antwerp
Port of Zeebrugge

Brazil

Port of Santos
Port of Centro
Port of Paranaguá
Port of Sepetiba
Port of Rio de Janeiro
Port of Salvador
Port of Vitoria

Canada

Port of Montreal
Port Metro Vancouver
Port of Prince Rupert
Port of Saint John
Port of Halifax
Port of Nanaimo

Chile

Port of Valparaiso
Port of Antofagasta
Port of Iquique
Port of Arica, Arica
Port of Talcahuano
Port of San Antonio
Port of Lirquen
Port of Coronel

China

Port of Dalian
Port of Foshan
Port of Guangzhou
Port of Hong Kong
Port of Lianyungang
Port of Ningbo
Port of Qingdao
Port of Shanghai
Port of Shenzhen
Port of Suzhou
Port of Tianjin
Port of Xiamen
Port of Yantai
Port of Yingkou

Croatia
Port of Ploče
Port of Rijeka
Adriatic Gate Container Terminal
Rijeka Gateway
Port of Split

Colombia

Port of Barranquilla, Cartagena
Port of Buenaventura
Port of Santa Marta

Cuba

Havana Harbor

Cyprus

Port of Limassol

Denmark
Aarhus
Copenhagen Malmö Port
Fredericia
Kalundborg
Aalborg

Djibouti

 Port of Djibouti

Dominican Republic

Multimodal Caucedo Port
Port of Rio Haina (Haina Occidental Port)

Egypt

Port Said
 West Port
 East Terminal
Sokhna
Alexandria Port
El-Dekhila
Damietta

Estonia

Port of Muuga
Port of Tallinn

Finland

Port of Hamina-Kotka
Port of Helsinki
Port of Pori
Port of Rauma

France

Port of Le Havre
Marseille-Fos Port
Port of Dunkirk, Dunkirk
Nantes – Saint Nazaire Port
Cayenne (French Guiana)

Germany

Port of Bremen/Bremerhaven
Port of Germersheim
Port of Hamburg
Lübeck Hafen-Gesellschaft
Rheinhafengesellschaft Weil am Rhein mbH

Greece

 Port of Piraeus, Athens
 Port of Thessaloniki
 Port of Volos
 Port of Alexandroupoli
 Port of Heraklion
 Port of Kavala

India

Port of Chennai
Port of Kollam
Port of Nhava Sheva (Jawaharlal Nehru Port)
Port of Mundra
Port of Visakhapatnam
Port of Vizhinjam (Vizhinjam International Seaport)
Port of Kolkata (Syama Prasad Mookerjee Port)
Port of Haldia
Port of Kakinada
Port of Hazira
Port of Pipavav
Port of Krishnapatnam
Port of Kochi
Port of Tuticorin (V. O. Chidambaranar Port)

Indonesia

Port of Cirebon, Cirebon
Port of Tanjung Priok, Jakarta
Port of Belawan, Medan
Port of Makassar, Makassar
Dwikora Harbour, Pontianak
Port of Trisakti, Banjarmasin
Port of Tanjung Perak, Surabaya
Port of Tanjung Mas, Semarang
Semayang Harbor, Balikpapan
Tenau Port, Kupang

Iran

Port of Bandar-Abbas
Port of Bandar-kohemini

Ireland

Dublin Port
Port of Cork

Israel

Port of Haifa
Port of Ashdod
Port of Eilat

Italy

Port of Genoa
Port of Gioia Tauro
Port of La Spezia
Port of Trieste
Port of Marghera
Port of Taranto
Port of Palermo
Port of Naples
Port of Salerno
Port of Livorno
Port of Civitavecchia

Jamaica
 Kingston Container Terminal (Port of Kingston), Kingston

Japan

Port of Nagoya
Port of Tokyo
Port of Yokohama
Port of Osaka
Port of Kobe
Port of Fukuyama
Port of Hiroshima
Port of Fukuoka

Jordan

Port of Aqaba

Kenya

Port of Mombasa

Latvia

Freeport of Riga

Lebanon

Port of Beirut
Port of Tripoli

Lithuania

Port of Klaipėda

Madagascar

Toamasina Autonomous Port

Malaysia

Penang Port
Port Klang
Port of Tanjung Pelepas
Sapangar Container Port

Malta

Malta Freeport, Birzebbuga

Mexico

Port of Veracruz
Port of Lázaro Cárdenas
Port of Manzanillo
Port of Altamira
Port of Ensenada
Port of Mazatlan
Port of Progreso
Port of Morelos

Montenegro

Port of Bar

Morocco
Agadir Port
Casablanca Port
Tanger-Med

Mozambique

Port of Maputo
Port of Beira
Port of Nacala

Netherlands

Port of Amsterdam
Port of Rotterdam

New Zealand

Ports of Auckland
CentrePort Wellington, Wellington Harbour
Port Nelson
Lyttleton Port, Lyttleton
Port Chalmers, Dunedin
Port of Tauranga
Napier Port

Nigeria

Port of Apapa, Lagos
Port of Tincan, Lagos

Norway

Port of Bergen
Port of Oslo

Oman

Port of Salalah
Muscat
SOHAR Port

Pakistan

Karachi Port
Port Qasim
Gwader Port
Qasim International container terminal
Karachi International container terminal
Pakistan International Container Terminal
South Asia Pakistan terminals
Qasim Freight Station
PEARL TCDT (First Transit Cargo Container Terminal in Karachi Pakistan)
PAKISTAN INTERNATIONAL BULK TERMINAL LIMITED

Panama

 Port of Balboa
 Port of Cristóbal, Colón
 Manzanillo International Terminal

Peru

Port of Callao, Lima
Port of Ilo
Port of Matarani

Philippines

Port of Manila

Poland

DCT Gdańsk
Port of Gdynia

Portugal

Port of Setúbal, Setubal
Port of Alcântara, Lisbon
Port of Leixões, Porto
Port of Sines, Sines

Qatar

Port of Hamad

Romania

Port of Constanţa

Russia

Vostochny Port, Vrangel
Port of Saint Petersburg
Kaliningrad Sea Commercial Port
Port of Novorossiysk
Port of Vladivostok, Free port of Vladivostok

Saudi Arabia

Jeddah Seaport
King Abdul Aziz Sea Port, Dammam
Port of Jubail (King Fahad Industrial Port)
Riyadh Dry Port

Senegal

Port of Dakar

Singapore

Port of Singapore

Slovenia

Port of Koper

South Africa

Port of Durban
Port of East London
Port of Port Elizabeth
Port of Cape Town
Port of Richards Bay
Port of Ngqura

South Korea

Port of Busan
Port of Incheon

Spain

Port of Algeciras
Port of Barcelona
Port of Bilbao
Port of Las Palmas
Port of Tarragona
Port of Valencia
Port of Vigo

Sri Lanka

Port of Colombo

Sudan

Port of Sudan

Suriname

Port of Paramaribo

Sweden

Ports of Stockholm
Port of Gothenburg
Copenhagen Malmö Port

Syria

Port of Latakia
Port of Tartus

Taiwan

Port of Kaohsiung
Port of Taichung
Port of Keelung

Tanzania

Port of Dar Es Salaam

Thailand

Port of Laem Chabang
Port of Bangkok

Turkey
Port of Aliağa
Port of Ambarlı
Port of Antalya
Port of Gemlik, Gemlik
Port of İskenderun
Port of Istanbul
Port of İzmir
Port of Izmit
Port of Kocaeli
Port of Mersin
Port of Samsun
Port of Tekirdağ
Port of Yalova

Ukraine

Port of Odessa

United Arab Emirates

Port of Dubai
Fujairah Port
Port of Khor Fakkan
Port of Sharjah
Jebel Ali
Abu Dhabi

United Kingdom

Port of Felixstowe
Port of Southampton
Port of Tilbury, London
London Gateway
London Thamesport
Seaforth Dock, Liverpool
Port of Belfast
Portsmouth
Grangemouth
Port of Immingham
Royal Portbury Dock, Bristol

United States

Port of Hueneme, California
Port of Long Beach, California
Port of Los Angeles, California
Port of Oakland, California
Port of Seattle, Washington
Port of Tacoma, Washington
PortMiami, Miami, Florida
Port Everglades, Florida
Port of Tampa, Florida
Port of New Orleans, Louisiana
Port of Boston, Massachusetts
Helen Delich Bentley Port of Baltimore, Maryland
Wilmington Marine Terminal, Delaware
Port of New York and New Jersey
Howland Hook Marine Terminal, Staten Island, New York
Port Jersey Marine Terminal, Jersey City, New Jersey
Port Newark-Elizabeth Marine Terminal, New Jersey
Red Hook Marine Terminal, Brooklyn, New York
Port of Savannah, Georgia
Port of Charleston, South Carolina
Port of Wilmington, North Carolina
Virginia Port Authority, Virginia
APM Terminals, Portsmouth, Virginia
Newport News Marine Terminal, Newport News, Virginia
Norfolk International Terminals, Norfolk, Virginia
Virginia Inland Port, Front Royal, Virginia
Port of Houston, Texas
Bayport Terminal, Houston, Texas
Port of Galveston, Texas
Port of Port Lavaca, Texas
Port of Mobile, Alabama
Port of Anchorage, Alaska
Port of Honolulu, Hawaii
Port of San Juan, Puerto Rico
Louisiana International Gulf Transfer Terminal Regional Center pre-construction phase

Uruguay

Port of Montevideo

Vietnam

Saigon Port (Ho Chi Minh City)

References

See also 

 List of busiest container ports
 List of ports

Container terminals